Logansport is an unincorporated community in Marion County, West Virginia, United States.

References

Unincorporated communities in Marion County, West Virginia
Unincorporated communities in West Virginia